Homeward Bound was a New Zealand television soap opera. It was first broadcast on TV3 on 11 June 1992 and ran for 21 episodes (including the two-hour pilot), finishing on 29 October 1992. Created by Ross Jennings, Homeward Bound was TV3's bid for NZ On Air funding for a local soap opera, however, it ultimately lost out to TVNZ's Shortland Street and was reformatted as an hour-long drama series.

Series overview
Plots centered on the domestic and professional lives of the extended Johnstone family and the residents of Riverside, a fictional rural community just south of the Bombay Hills. The area encompassed a pub and beer garden, a general store and garage, a community hall, a school, a church, a sawmill and a rubbish tip.

Homeward Bound was produced by Soap (NZ) Ltd, a joint venture between Isambard Productions and Communicado, with funding from NZ On Air. The series was broadcast on TV3 on Thursdays at 7.30pm from June until October 1992.

The theme tune was composed by New Zealand musician Dave Dobbyn.

Cast

Main cast 
 Michael Daly as Graeme Johnstone
 Liddy Holloway as Janine Johnstone
 Mark Raffety as Dan Johnstone
 Francis Bell as Bob Johnstone
 Karl Urban as Tim Johnstone
 Sylvia Rands as Suzanne Johnstone
 Peter Elliott as Neil Johnstone
 David Aston as Gordon Jonstone
 June Bishop as Isabella "Izzy" Johnstone
 Simone Kessell as Hannah Tumai

Guest and recurring cast 
 Mandie Simons as Amy Johnstone
 Ben Alpers as Grant Johnstone
 Charlotte Woollams as Katey Johnstone
 Tina Grenville as Val Johnstone
 Rebekah Mercer as Wendy Johnstone
 Victoria Harrison as Sophie Johnstone
 Doug Aston as Uncle Haddon
 Margaret Murray as Auntie Beth
 Nancy Flyger as Mavis Bartlett
 Dai Evans as The Minister
 Waihoroi Shortland as Monte Tumai
 Eliza Bidois as Lisa Tumai
 John Watson as Det Sgt Kuipers
 Frank Whitten
 Hine Elder as Louise Harvey
 Michael Anthony Noonan as Toby Paykel
Ken Blackburn as Noel Connor
 Tiara Lowndes as Kelly Marsh
 Alison Routledge as Charley
 Kelsey Howlett / Jonathan Mason as Jonty Harvey
 Jon Kernutt as Kieran Connor
 Helena Ross as Trisha Connor
 Alistair Browning as Dr McIntyre
 Ian Harrop as The Publican
 Jon Bridges as Andy

Episodes

References

External links

1990s New Zealand television series
1992 New Zealand television series debuts
1992 New Zealand television series endings
English-language television shows
New Zealand television soap operas
Television shows funded by NZ on Air
Television shows set in New Zealand
Three (TV channel) original programming